Bellator 296: Mousasi vs. Edwards (also known as Bellator Paris) is an upcoming mixed martial arts event produced by Bellator MMA that will take place on May 12, 2023, at Accor Arena in Paris, France.

Background 
A middleweight title eliminator bout between former Bellator Middleweight Champion Gegard Mousasi and Fabian Edwards is expected to headline the event.

A Bellator Lightweight World Grand Prix quarterfinal bout between Mansour Barnaoui and Sidney Outlaw was expected to serve as the co-main event. However at the end of February, Outlaw tested postive for banned substances and was suspended, and was replaced by former Bellator Lightweight Champion Brent Primus.

Fight card

See also 

 2023 in Bellator MMA
 List of Bellator MMA events
 List of current Bellator fighters
 Bellator MMA Rankings

References 

Bellator MMA events
2023 in mixed martial arts
2023 in French sport
Mixed martial arts in France
Sports competitions in Paris
May 2023 sports events in France
Scheduled mixed martial arts events